Carabus rossii is a species of beetle from the family Carabidae, found in Italy. The species are brown-coloured with black pronotum.

References

rossii
Beetles described in 1826
Beetles of Europe